Paul Culbertson (born November 12, 1975) is a former American professional basketball player who played college basketball for Nevada.

References

1975 births
Living people
American expatriate basketball people in Canada
American expatriate basketball people in Israel
American expatriate basketball people in North Macedonia
American men's basketball players
Basketball players from New York (state)
Hapoel Holon players
Nevada Wolf Pack men's basketball players
People from Roosevelt, New York
Riverside City Tigers men's basketball players
Yakima Sun Kings players
Small forwards
Shooting guards